The Netherlands was represented by Rudi Carrell, with the song "Wat een geluk", at the 1960 Eurovision Song Contest, which took place on 29 March in London. Although Teddy Scholten had won the previous contest for the Netherlands, Dutch broadcaster NTS declined to host the contest for a second time in two years, so 1959 runners-up the United Kingdom had agreed to host the 1960 contest, which was staged by the BBC at London's Royal Festival Hall.

Song and singer were chosen independently of each other at the Dutch national final, held on 9 February. Other participants included future Dutch representatives Greetje Kauffeld (1961) and Annie Palmen (1963).

Before Eurovision

Nationaal Songfestival 1960
The national final took place at the AVRO TV studios in Hilversum, hosted by Hannie Lips. Eight songs were involved, with all songs presented twice by different performers, once with a full orchestra and once in a more pared-down style. The format was basically the same as that used in 1959, apart from the fact that this year each singer performed only once so there were 16 participants in total.

The winning song was chosen by votes from regional juries, then an "expert" jury decided which of the two performers of the winning song should go to London. After "Wat een geluk" was announced the winner the expert jury chose Carrell over Palmen as the singer.

At Eurovision 
On the night of the final Rudi Carrell performed 10th in the running order, following Switzerland and preceding Germany. At the close of voting "Wat een geluk" had received 2 points, placing the Netherlands 12th of the 13 entries, ahead only of Luxembourg. The Dutch jury awarded its highest mark (5) to the United Kingdom.

The Dutch conductor at the contest was Dolf van der Linden.

Rudi Carrell's bad result marked the start of a very poor Eurovision decade for the Netherlands, in which the country never placed higher than 10th again until Lenny Kuhr's shared victory in the 1969 contest.

Voting 
Every country had a jury of ten people. Every jury member could give one point to his or her favourite song.

External links 
 Dutch Preselection 1960

References 

1960
Countries in the Eurovision Song Contest 1960
Eurovision